Guan District is a District in Oti Region in Ghana. Its capital is Likpe-Mate. It was created in 2021.

References

Districts of the Oti Region
States and territories established in 2021